San Bruno may refer to:

San Bruno, California, United States, a city
San Bruno (BART station)
San Bruno (Caltrain station)
San Bruno Mountain, California
San Bruno Creek, California
San Bruno, Baja California Sur, Mexico, a populated place
Misión San Bruno, a short-lived Jesuit mission (1683-1685) on the Gulf of California
Vicente San Bruno (died 1817), Spanish military officer

See also
Saint Bruno (disambiguation)